NME Cool List was an annual listing of popular musicians compiled by the weekly British music magazine NME. The list was created each November by the magazine's writers and journalists, and was based on the 50 musicians that they considered to be the "coolest". Each year's list was first announced by NME through both a dedicated issue of their magazine and their official website, NME.com – the Cool List issue often attracted high sales. The first list was published on 29 October 2002, to highlight the people who were "at the forefront of the music scene" – Jack White, the lead singer of American rock band The White Stripes, topped the first poll. Since then, it was published a further eight times: it ran every year from 2003 to 2011, with the exception of 2009. Musicians such as Justin Timberlake, Pete Doherty and Laura Marling topped these subsequent listings. The final artist to top NME Cool List was the American rapper Azealia Banks in 2011.

Alongside the Cool List, NME also often concurrently published alternative lists, such as the Fool List, the Had It, Lost It list, the If Only They Rocked list, and the Cool Places list. Fool Lists included individuals such as George W. Bush and Mark Ronson; Had It, Lost It lists featured Bobby Gillespie and Richard Archer; If Only They Rocked lists included the likes of Ferenc Gyurcsány and Charlie Brooker. As well as high sales, the Cool List also generated a large critical response for NME, from both journalists and members of the public: the magazine received criticism of its lists from various sources, including music journalists, pop stars, and drugs charities.

History
NME first Cool List was compiled in 2002, with its inaugural winner being Jack White, the lead singer of The White Stripes. White topped the list for "turning down Gap, his rediscovery of rock's debt to the blues, and for being the fire that torched the whole new rock revolution". The American pop star Justin Timberlake topped the second Cool List in 2003, with the magazine praising his "killer career moves, genuine talent, charm and good looks". Deputy editor Alex Needham remarked: "In a world of moaning micro-celebs, Justin makes being a superstar look the most fun you could have with your clothes half off."

Carl Barât of The Libertines was placed at number five on the 2003 Cool List. The following year he rose to number one alongside his bandmate Pete Doherty, the first and  only time the list has been topped by more than one person. To commemorate the 2004 list, the cover of the NME issue promoting it was a 3D lenticular image of Doherty, which the magazine claimed was a "world first". The year after, Alex Turner, the lead singer of British indie rock band Arctic Monkeys, was named the coolest person of the year, with NME citing his "authenticity" as the reason for his placing. Turner would go on to feature in a further four Cool Lists, including at number six in 2007 and number four in 2008.

The first woman to top the Cool List was Beth Ditto, the lead singer of American band The Gossip, in 2006. The 2006 list was noted as the most female-oriented to date, with five women in the top ten. NME described Ditto as "a true product of the underground", with Needham hailing her "voice like Tina Turner gargling ball bearings" and her "megawatt stage presence". Writing for The Observer, music journalist Kitty Empire remarked that "placing Beth Ditto at the top of the Cool List is an audacious move that shows NME is finally questioning its institutional chap-ism". Recounting The Gossip's rise to success in her memoir Coal to Diamonds, Ditto cited topping the Cool List as the moment "when things got weird".

Ditto was placed at number nine in the 2007 Cool List, which was celebrated as the "oldest ever" – its entries had a combined age of 1,389 (approximately 28 years each). The list was topped by 23-year-old Gallows frontman Frank Carter, who celebrated by planning a tattoo on his leg that proclaimed "Fuck the NME". The following year's Top 50 was published exclusively on NME.com, with only the Top 10 featuring in the magazine. Like its previous year, the 2008 list was praised for its inclusion of "old rockers", such as Peter Gabriel, Robert Plant and Johnny Marr. It was topped by 20-year-old Crystal Castles singer Alice Glass.

No Cool List was published in 2009 – it returned the following year as an expanded Top 75, with the British folk singer Laura Marling reaching number one. The final artist to top the Cool List was Azealia Banks, who was named the coolest person of the year in 2011. NME hailed Banks for her "youthful rebellion" and her "can-do, fuck-you attitude". Accepting the honour, Banks remarked: "I'm fucking talented."

Cool List winners

Alternative lists
In conjunction with their Cool Lists, NME also often concurrently published four alternative lists to highlight the "other end of the spectrum": the Fool List, the Had It, Lost It list, the If Only They Rocked list, and the Cool Places list.

The Fool List ranked the "10 most uncool people", and was published alongside every Cool List, with the exceptions of 2003, 2006 and 2008. The first list was titled the "They Think They're Cool... But Aren't" list, and was topped by British pop star Robbie Williams. NME Nicola Wood explained that Williams "permanently [tried] to display this image of being hip and cool", and that his lyrics were not "as up to date as they used to be". Subsequent Fool List toppers have included US president George W. Bush (2004), and broadcaster Richard Bacon (2005). The 2007 Fool List was topped by musician Mark Ronson – upon finding out, Ronson remarked: "This kind of sucks."

The Had It, Lost It list charted the people who "used to be cool, but now aren't". It was first published in 2002, and was compiled with each Cool List since then. The first listing was topped by Bobby Gillespie, the lead singer of British indie band Primal Scream, for having "chickened out" over the title of his track "Bomb the Pentagon", and instead renaming it "Rise". Richard Archer, frontman for indie rock band Hard-Fi, topped the list in 2007 for "[dressing] like an 11-plus drop out". The final list-toppers were the British band Gallows, who were placed first on the 2011 list. Explaining the choice, NME stated: "Without the mad ginger bloke shouting and jumping off the railings, we're just not having it."

The If Only They Rocked list recorded the "10 coolest non-musicians", and included comedians, actors, footballers, fictional characters, and cats. Its first winner, in 2002, was Jackass star Johnny Knoxville, whom the magazine hailed as an "extreme dude". It has since been published alongside every Cool List except 2003 – its winners have included Hungarian Prime Minister Ferenc Gyurcsány, TV critic Charlie Brooker, and a pigeon. Italian footballer Mario Balotelli topped the 2011 listing for being "mean, moody, [and] fond of indoor firework displays".

The Cool Places list was first compiled in 2003, and comprised two separate charts: "Cool Places in the UK" and "Cool Places the World Over", with Leeds and Berlin topping them respectively. The two charts were consolidated into a single "Cool Places" list in 2004, which was topped by the extension housing the record collection of recently deceased DJ John Peel. The Cool Places list was compiled a further two times, before being retired in 2008.

Criticism

According to Neil Robinson, NME publishing director, the Cool List often generated a "big reaction" from critics – since its introduction in 2002, it attracted responses from several sources. After naming Pete Doherty as the "coolest" person of 2004, the magazine was criticised by drug charities and accused of glamorising drug abuse, as Doherty was, at the time, fighting addictions to both heroin and crack cocaine. Rebecca Cheshire of drugs charity Addaction explained that "young people are vulnerable to hard drugs and not everyone has the ability to fall back on expensive rehabilitation programmes like rock stars." Needham responded by stating that the magazine did not endorse drug abuse, and that it was "not a heroin addiction which makes Pete Doherty the coolest".

Following the publication of the 2006 Cool List, British pop star Lily Allen, who had been placed third that year, slammed the magazine for opting to choose a photograph of rock band Muse for that issue's cover, instead of a photograph of the women who were featured in the list's top ten. Writing on her MySpace blog, Allen branded NME as "patronising" and "sexist". Addressing the magazine directly, Allen declared: "You put Muse on the cover 'cause you thought that your readers might not buy a magazine with an overweight lesbian and a not particularly attractive looking me, on the front. Wankers." Beth Ditto of The Gossip, who had topped the list, agreed, labelling the NME journalists as "chickens" and claiming that they had "totally copped out" on the cover.

In discussion of the 2010 Cool List, music critic Neil McCormick criticised its lack of racial diversity. Writing for The Daily Telegraph, McCormick noted that "according to the NME, there are only seven cool black people in pop culture right now", with popular British rappers such as Tinie Tempah and Dizzee Rascal failing to make the listing. Summing up his opinion, McCormick stated that he found the list "deeply disturbing", and asked: "Did I fight in the punk wars for this?"

Compilation albums
To coincide with the publications of the 2004–05 Cool Lists, NME produced two compilation albums, both of which featured music from artists who had been placed high on the lists. The first album, titled NME: The Cool List, was a limited edition CD covermounted to the 4 December 2004 issue of the magazine, one week after the announcement of that year's list. A 15-track album, it included songs from bands such as Babyshambles, Goldie Lookin Chain, The Futureheads and Bloc Party. The second compilation, NME: The Cool List 2005, was covermounted on the 26 November 2005 issue of NME – the 16-track CD featured songs from The Cribs, Test Icicles and Antony and the Johnsons. Discussing this compilation, senior marketing manager Nick New remarked: "The NME Cool List CD is a great way of NME showcasing what we do best – NME bringing exciting new bands to our readers!"

References

New Musical Express
2002 introductions
Annual events in the United Kingdom
British music industry
Lists of musicians